Ocket Castle is a house, on the site of a castle, in Heusden, Destelbergen, East Flanders, Belgium. It probably originated on the former fief of Grooten Hoek that lasted until the 15th century. The castle was depicted on a 1725 map by PJ Benthuys as a building with a moat near the Scheldt and is mentioned in 1767 as a "partije genaemt den grieten hoeck met de mote ende huys van playsance". The present Neoclassical building dates largely from the 18th and 19th centuries but contains a dining room on the east side that in the 17th/18th century was the core of the structure, as was established among other things from the beams and the Rococo stucco decorations.

Both the building itself and the surrounding grounds have been listed as cultural heritage since 2009.

References

Further reading
  Bogaert C. & Verbeeck M., 1989: Inventaris van het cultuurbezit in België, Architectuur, Provincie Oost-Vlaanderen, Arrondissement Gent, Kantons Destelbergen - Oosterzele. Bouwen door de eeuwen heen in Vlaanderen 12N2, Brussel - Turnhout

Castles in East Flanders